Dennis Boutsikaris (born December 21, 1952) is an American character actor who has won the Obie Award twice. He is also a narrator of audiobooks, for which he has won 13 Golden Earphone Awards and 8 Audie Awards. He won Best Audiobook of the Year from Amazon for his reading of The Gene.

Early life and education
Boutsikaris was born in Newark, New Jersey, to a Greek American father and Jewish mother, and grew up in Berkeley Heights, New Jersey. He took up acting while a student at Governor Livingston High School, because he felt he was too small to succeed in athletics. A graduate of Hampshire College in Amherst, Massachusetts, Boutsikaris toured the country with John Houseman's The Acting Company doing classical theatre.

Career
Boutsikaris' film credits include leading roles in *batteries not included, The Dream Team, Crocodile Dundee II, Boys on the Side and In Dreams, among many others.  His most recent indie films include Cherry Crush, The Education of Charlie Banks, Calling It Quits, ”The Bourne Legacy” and “Money Monster”. He is Paul Wolfowitz in Oliver Stone's "W." In 2012, he co-starred in The Bourne Legacy, the fourth installment of the successful Bourne franchise.

On television, he had the lead in the series Stat, The Jackie Thomas Show, and Misery Loves Company.  He has also had recurring roles on Sidney Lumet's 100 Centre Street, Nurse, Trinity, ER, Law & Order and Showtime's Shameless.
Boutsikaris had a leading part in episode 20 of the second season of the hit CBS show Person of Interest which aired in the USA on Thursday, April 26, 2013. He was part of NBC's State of Affairs, the TV series that marks the return to series television of Katherine Heigl. In 2012, he also made an appearance as Jack Quayle in the season 2 episode "Collateral Damage" of the CBS show Blue Bloods. From 2015 to 2022, he played the role of lawyer Rich Schweikart in the first, second, then fourth through sixth seasons of the American series Better Call Saul. In 2017, Boutsikaris was cast in the recurring role of Henry Roarke on the ABC thriller series Quantico.

He has starred in over 20 TV movies, including Chasing the Dragon, And Then There Was One, Three Faces of Karen, Survival on the Mountain, Beyond Betrayal, and as Woody Allen in the miniseries Love and Betrayal: The Mia Farrow Story (with Patsy Kensit).

Theater
On Broadway Boutsikaris became the first American to play Mozart in Amadeus, and was directed by Laurence Olivier in Filumena. He starred in the Off-Broadway production of Sight Unseen to great critical acclaim.

He has been seen on Broadway in Bent and Amadeus (as the first American to play Mozart) with Frank Langella.  He was seen in the Delacorte Theatre's production of Julius Caesar as Cassius.  He was in the original New York productions of The Boys Next Door, A Picasso, and the revival of That Championship Season.

Off-Broadway he is probably best known for playing Jonathan Waxman in the original production of Sight Unseen at the Manhattan Theatre Club and later at the Orpheum Theatre.  He received the Obie Award and a nomination for a Drama Desk Award for this performance. At the Geffen Theatre in Los Angeles he appeared in the premiere of David Mamet's The Old Neighborhood and in 2007 Jane Anderson's The Quality of Life with Laurie Metcalf and Jo Beth Williams.  For that performance he received the Backstage West Garland Award for Best Actor and was nominated for Best Actor by the L.A. Critics Drama Circle and by the LA Alliance Ovation Awards.

In 2009 he was in the Broadway revivals of Brighton Beach Memoirs and Broadway Bound again with Laurie Metcalf. The former opened to wide critical acclaim and then closed one week later. The latter never opened.

He continued his association with Laurie Metcalf appearing with her in The Other Place Off-Broadway.

Voice work
He can be heard in over 160 audiobooks and has received eight Audie Awards and two Best Voices of the Year Awards from AudioFile Magazine. He was voted Best Narrator of the Year by Amazon for “The Gene”.

Awards
Boutsikaris has received two Obie Awards:  one in 1985 for Outstanding Performance in Nest of the Woodgrouse at the New York Shakespeare Festival, directed by Joseph Papp; and one in 1992 for Outstanding Performance in Sight Unseen at the Manhattan Theatre Club.  He also received a Drama Desk Award nomination for Best Actor for Sight Unseen, as well as a Cable ACE nomination for Best Supporting Actor for Chasing the Dragon in 1995. He was nominated for a People's Choice Award as best Newcomer. He received the Best Actor Award at the Staten Island Film Festival and the Long island Film Festival for his role in Calling It Quits.

Personal life
Boutsikaris was married to actress Deborah Hedwall; they divorced in 2002.

References

External links

1952 births
American male film actors
American people of Greek descent
American male television actors
Hampshire College alumni
Jewish American male actors
Living people
Obie Award recipients
People from Berkeley Heights, New Jersey
Male actors from Newark, New Jersey
21st-century American Jews